Jack O'Connell is an Irish former rugby union player. His preferred position is loosehead prop.

Having come through the Leinster Academy, he made his senior debut in November 2012 against the Glasgow Warriors.

References

1990 births
Living people
Leinster Rugby players
Bristol Bears players
Ealing Trailfinders Rugby Club players
Rugby union props